Smoluća Gornja  is a village in the municipality of Lukavac, Bosnia and Herzegovina.

History

In June 1992, during the Bosnian War, the Serbs living in neighboring settlements, (namely Podpeć, Tinja, Jasenica, Srebrenik, Gornji Lukavac) were expelled to Smoluća Gornja. However, the village came under siege by the Army of the Republic of Bosnia and Herzegovina, leaving the population without water, food, electricity, or medicine. The Bosniak and Croat forces blocked the Red Cross access to the village, as well as importation of food and medicine, as well as evacuation of the sick and wounded, until the Army of Republika Srpska freed them. In the siege period from June 18 to August 27, 1992, 50 Serbs were killed in the Smoluca area, and 149 in the wider area (Podpeć, Tinja, Jasenica, Srebrenik, Gornji Lukavac). After the population was freed on August 29 1992, Smoluca was completely robbed and burned by Bosniak and Croat units.

Demographics 
According to the 2013 census, its population was 6.

References

Populated places in Lukavac